The Heather oil field is a significant crude oil producing field in the UK sector of the northern North Sea, 458 km north-north-east of Aberdeen. Production of oil started in 1978 and ceased in 2019. The Heather Alpha installation is currently (2021) undergoing decommissioning.

The field 
The Heather oil field is located in Block 2/5 of the UK North Sea. It is named after the plant that grows extensively on Scottish moors. The Heather field was discovered in December 1973 and comprises a middle Jurassic sandstone at a depth of 9,800 to 11,750 feet (2,9873 to 3,581 m). The reservoir and its fluids had the following characteristics:

Owners and operators 
The initial owners of the field were a consortium comprising Unionoil Company of Great Britain (31.25%), Texaco North Sea UK Ltd (31.25%), Tenneco Great Britain Ltd (31.25%), and DNO (UK) Ltd. (6.25%). The field was operated by Unionoil Company of Great Britain. In 1994 the owners were BG Great Britain Limited (31.25%), Texaco Exploration Ltd (31.25%), Unocal Britain Ltd (31.25%), and DNO (Heather Oilfield) Ltd (6.25%). The operator was Unocal. In 1999 DNO became the operator, then Lundin from 2008, and finally Enquest.

Development 
The field was developed by a single integrated drilling, production and accommodation platform: Heather Alpha (Heather A). The principal design data of the Heather A platform is given in the following table.

Processing 
The wellhead fluids flowed via the production manifold to the 3-phase Production Separator which operated at 65 psi (448 kPa). From the Separator oil was routed to another 3-phase Production Separator operating at a lower pressure of 35 psi (241 kPa). Oil then flowed to the crude booster pumps, through oil metering then by 32 km 16-inch pipeline to Ninian Central and thence to Sullom Voe. Produced water from the separators was treated by hydrocylones and a compact flotation unit (CFU) to remove oil prior to overboard discharge. Vapour from the Production Separators was compressed, dried by TEG (triethylene glycol) and further compressed to 325 psi (2,241 kPa) for use as fuel gas and up to 1,480 psi (10,204 kPa) for gas lift. In 1985 a connection was made to the Western leg gas pipeline, a 6-inch pipeline imported gas into Heather to augment gas supplies. Import gas flowed to an Import Gas Knockout Drum, through metering and to an Import Gas Heater.

The oil production profile for Heather A (in 1000s barrels per year) in the early operating period is shown in the graph:The fluid handling capability of the Heather facilities in its latter years was as follows:

Broom oil field 
Fluids from the Broom oil field in Block 2/4a were routed into Heather for treatment and export to Ninian Central. The Broom field is located 7 km from Heather. The field development comprised four gas-lifted production wells and two water injection wells. Lift gas and injection water were supplied from Heather A. Production from Broom started in 2004.

Decommissioning 
Following a fire on Heather A in October 2019 and the shutdown of the platform Enquest decided to decommission the platform. This was principally due to the low oil price environment during the coronavirus pandemic. The topsides will be removed for onshore recycling and disposal. The removal of the jacket will be the subject off a further plan.

References 

North Sea oil fields
Oil fields of Scotland
Oil fields of the United Kingdom